The Washington Law Review is the flagship law review at the University of Washington School of Law.  The first Washington Law Review was established in 1919 and published only a single volume, while the current publication history starts in 1925.  From 1936 to 1961, the journal was titled Washington Law Review and State Bar Journal.  The Law Review publishes an annual volume of legal scholarship consisting of four issues.

References

External links
 

Law Review
Publications established in 1925
Publications established in 1919
English-language journals
American law journals
Law journals edited by students
General law journals